Roly Santos is an Argentinean filmmaker, screenwriter, and producer. Santos made his directorial debut with How Silly We Are to Grow Up (2000) and, in 2017, co-directed Coffee for All alongside Fulvio Iannucci, which was released on Netflix. Santos is a member of DAC - Directores Argentinos Cinematograficos, the association of Argentine film directors.

Education 
Santos graduated from Escuela Nacional de Experimentación y Realización Cinematográfica (ENERC) ( Argentina's National School of Film) in the 1980s, and later acquired a sociology degree from Universidad de Buenos Aires (University of Buenos Aires) in 1991.

Career 
Santos produced films in many countries around the world. His directorial debut, How Silly We Are to Grow Up, was a fiction feature film (2000-Official Selection San Sebastian, IFF La Havana, and IFF Figueira Foz). Roly Santos worked as producer and director on TV shows, movies, and documentaries such as Crisol, Hi India, and New Dubliners. He received Best Director and Best Edition awards for Hands Together—a documentary feature—in Figueira Film Art (2015). With his Italian partners, he created Caffè Sospeso, a feature documentary released by Netflix in 2018 with the English title "Coffee For All". Santos also produced and directed Dedalo, a fiction series. In 2019 he produced and directed a fiction feature Water Pigs, also known as "Agua dos Porcos/Aguas Selvagens", a co-production between Argentina and Brazil.

Author/teacher 
Santos teaches about labor rights and intellectual property rights for technicians, directors, actors, and musicians of the film industry worldwide. He is a member of "DAC" Argentine Directors, Argentores (scriptwriters), and 100autori (Italy). He was founder and coordinator of FEDALA America Latin Writers and Film Directors Federation, 2003–2010.

 Argentine Cultural Industries,(Publics policies and economic market) - research collaboration with author O. Getino

Violence on television children programs (1994) - author.

Activity under military dictatorship period 
1980 - When "Mothers of the Plaza de Mayo" began their rounds around the square, very few Argentines were present. Santos filmed some of the events. As a film director, he accompanied them at times during the civic-military dictatorship, documenting marches and the repressions suffered by the Mothers and himself.
1982 - "When our classmate Roly Santos and Kino González shot social and testimonial film content, so they were expelled from School Film military authority".

Filmography

Film Director 

 2019: Agua dos Porcos (Fiction feature)
 2018: Dedalo (Fiction Series)
 2017: Café pendiente (Documentary)
 2016: New Dubliners  (Documentaries Series).
 2015: Hola India  (Documentaries Series).
 2014: Manos Unidas  (Documentary feature and Series).
 2013: Crisol (Documentaries Series)
 2000: Que absurdo es haber crecido  (Fiction feature)
 1988: Diálogos en el Noroeste  (Short).
 1986: Revelación  (Short).

Screen Writer 

 2016: New Dubliners
 2015: Hola India
 2014: Manos Unidas
2013: Crisol (Documentaries Series)
 2000: Que absurdo es haber crecido
 1988: Diálogos en el Noroeste
 1986: Revelación

Producer 

 2020 Letto numero 6 (Fiction feature –Co-producer)
 2019: [[Agua dos Porcos/Aguas Selvagens]] (Co-producer) 2018: Dedalo 2017: Café pendiente (Co-producer)
 2016: New Dubliners 
 2015: Hola India 2014: Manos Unidas
2013: Crisol (Documentaries Series)
 2000: Que absurdo es haber crecido 1988: Diálogos en el Noroeste 1986: Revelación Cameraman 

 2017: Café pendiente 2016: New Dubliners 2015: Hola India 2014: Manos Unidas Montaje 

 1986: Gombrowicz o la seducción'' (Documentary)

References 

Argentine film directors
Argentine film producers
Argentine screenwriters